Mpho' Gift Ngoepe (mm-POH, n-GO-pay; born 18 January 1990) is a South African former professional baseball shortstop and second baseman. He played in Major League Baseball (MLB) for the Pittsburgh Pirates and Toronto Blue Jays. In 2017, he became the first native of continental Africa to reach the Major Leagues.

Professional career

Pittsburgh Pirates
A native of Randburg, Ngoepe became the first black South African, and the sixth South African to sign a professional baseball contract when he signed in October 2008. When Ngoepe was growing up, his mother was a clubhouse attendant for the Randburg Mets, and they lived in one of the clubhouse rooms. He was invited to Major League Baseball's academy in Tirrenia, Italy, where the Pirates signed him.

In 2009, Ngoepe played for the Rookie-level Gulf Coast League Pirates, and batted .238/.341/.281 with one home run, nine runs batted in (RBI), and 13 stolen bases in 47 games. He was a member of the South Africa national baseball team at the 2009 World Baseball Classic. At the 2009 WBC, he hit consecutive triples off of Mexico's Elmer Dessens in a 14–3 loss to Mexico. On 10 August 2009, Sports Illustrated published an article on Ngoepe titled "A Gift From Africa" which covered how he started his baseball career, his upbringing, and time with the Pirates since moving from South Africa. In 2010, he played 64 games with the Short Season-A State College Spikes and two with the Advanced-A Bradenton Marauders, batting a combined .206/.316/.318 with one home run, 20 RBI, and 11 stolen bases.

Ngoepe played only 27 games in 2011 due to a hamate injury. He batted .297/.354/.440 with two home runs and five RBI before the injury.

Ngoepe played the entire 2012 season with Bradenton, and in a then career-high 124 games played he hit .232/.330/.338 with nine home runs and 36 RBI and a career-high 22 stolen bases. He also played 16 games for the Scottsdale Scorpions of the Arizona Fall League. In 2013, he again began the season with Bradenton, playing 28 games and batting .292/.424/.427 before being promoted to the Double-A Altoona Curve, where he played 72 games. In Altoona, Ngeope batted .177/.278/.282 with three home runs, 16 RBI, and 10 stolen bases. He made his second trip to the Arizona Fall League at the end of the season, playing 17 games for Scottsdale.

In 2014, Ngeope set career-highs in games played and RBI, playing 131 games with Altoona and batting .238/.319/.380 with nine home runs, 52 RBI, and 13 stolen bases. He was invited to 2015 spring training by the Pirates on 9 January 2015. He played for the Indianapolis Indians of the Triple-A International League in 2016.

On 26 April 2017, the Pirates promoted Ngoepe to the major leagues from Indianapolis. This made him the first continental African player, and the first player from an independent African nation, to reach the Major Leagues. Ngoepe made his Major League debut that day, and recorded his first career hit, a single off Cubs' starting pitcher Jon Lester. Because of time zone differences, Ngoepe's MLB debut fell on the early morning of 27 April in South Africa, observed in that country as Freedom Day, memorializing the 1994 election that was the first in which the country's black population was allowed to vote. In 2017 with Pittsburgh he batted .222/.323/.296.

Toronto Blue Jays
On 20 November 2017, Ngoepe was traded to the Toronto Blue Jays for cash considerations or a player to be named later. He earned a spot on the active roster to begin the season, and was optioned to the Triple-A Buffalo Bisons on 20 April, with whom he batted .168/.304/.252. With Toronto he had one hit in 19 at bats. He was designated for assignment on 3 May 2018. Ngoepe was released from the organization on 13 August 2018.

Sydney Blue Sox
On 30 August 2018, Ngoepe signed with the Sydney Blue Sox of the Australian Baseball League (a winter league) for the 2018/19 season. He batted .357/.451/.700.

Philadelphia Phillies
On 11 January 2019, Ngoepe signed a minor league contract with the Philadelphia Phillies. He played for the Class AAA Lehigh Valley IronPigs, and batted .221/.296/.410 with 5 home runs and 21 RBIs in 122 at bats, playing second base, third base, and shortstop. He was released on 20 June 2019.

Second stint with Pittsburgh Pirates
On 29 June 2019, Ngoepe signed a minor league contract with the Pittsburgh Pirates and was assigned to the Double-A Altoona Curve. He batted .100/.289/.100 in 30 at bats. He was released on 30 July 2019.

Lancaster Barnstormers
On 6 August 2019, Ngoepe signed with the Lancaster Barnstormers of the independent Atlantic League of Professional Baseball. He batted .289/.317/.632 with three home runs and seven RBIs for them in 38 at bats, playing seven games at shortstop and four games at second base.

Second stint with Sydney Blue Sox
Ngoepe returned to the Sydney Blue Sox of the Australian Baseball League for the 2019/20 season.

Québec Capitales
On March 30, 2021, Ngoepe signed with the Québec Capitales of the Frontier League.

Coaching

Newport Rams
On 16 March 2022, Ngoepe became a coach with the Newport Rams of Baseball Victoria.

Arizona Diamondbacks
In January 2023, Ngoepe was announced as a coach for the ACL Diamondbacks, a minor league affiliate of the Arizona Diamondbacks.

Personal life
Ngoepe is married to Cait and they have a son Kiani.

Ngoepe's younger brother, Victor, is a former Pirates prospect.

References

External links

1990 births
Living people
Altoona Curve players
Bradenton Marauders players
Buffalo Bisons (minor league) players
South African expatriate baseball players in Australia
Expatriate baseball players in Canada
Gulf Coast Pirates players
Indianapolis Indians players
Lancaster Barnstormers players
Lehigh Valley IronPigs players
Major League Baseball players from South Africa
Major League Baseball second basemen
Major League Baseball shortstops
Major League Baseball third basemen
People from Polokwane
People from Randburg
Pittsburgh Pirates players
Scottsdale Scorpions players
South African expatriate baseball players in the United States
South African expatriate sportspeople in Canada
South African Sotho people
Sportspeople from Johannesburg
State College Spikes players
Sydney Blue Sox players
Toronto Blue Jays players
West Virginia Black Bears players
West Virginia Power players
2009 World Baseball Classic players
Sportspeople from Limpopo
Minor league baseball coaches